Baja California Territory (Territorio de Baja California) was a Mexican territory from 1824 to 1931, that encompassed the Baja California Peninsula of present-day northwestern Mexico. It replaced the Baja California Province (1773–1824) of the Spanish colonial Viceroyalty of New Spain, after Mexican independence. Along with Alta California, the two territories were split from the Spanish The Californias region.

In 1931, Baja California Territory was divided into "North Territory of Baja California" and "Territory of Baja California Sur". In 1952, the "North Territory" became the 29th State of Mexico as Baja California. In 1974, the "South Territory" became the 31st state as Baja California Sur.

Province

Baja California's northern border with Alta California was first established to demarcate areas of Franciscan and Dominican missionary authority, precisely set on August 19, 1773, near San Juan Bautista Creek by Fray Francisco Palóu. A marker stands on the line formerly dividing the two countries. The marker is behind the ruins of Misión San Miguel Arcángel de la Frontera, in La Misión, Baja California. Palóu's line was adopted as the provincial dividing line in 1804.

In 1848, under the Treaty of Guadalupe-Hidalgo, this international border was shifted further north to San Diego Bay, adjusting it to the claim of Juan Rodríguez Cabrillo and the "sea-to-sea" claims of Sir Francis Drake and of the former colony of South Carolina.

Translated into English, the inscription on the marker reads:

San Juan Bautista Creek: Juan Crespí, May 1 for the setting of the first international division line between Old or Lower California (Dominicans) and New or Upper California (Franciscans) five leagues to the north (Valley of the Médanos) being established by: Priest Francisco Palóu on 19 August 1773 (Mojonera of Palou) in compliance with the instructions put forth on the April 7, 1772 Concordato.Rosarito Historical Society, Baja California A.C. at The Mission, Baja California, on 20 May 1990. Fieldwork and research: . Monument donation: Mario Reyes Coronado De Villasari & family . Construction: Students of the School of Tourism at U.A.B.C.(Autonomous University of Baja California).

See also
Las Californias Province – Spanish colonial period, 1768–1804.
Baja California Province – Spanish colonial period, 1804–1824.
Alta California territory – 1824-1846, present-day California, Nevada, New Mexico, and Utah.
Spanish missions in Baja California

References

Colonial Mexico
Provinces of the Spanish Empire
Territories of Mexico
History of Baja California
History of Baja California Sur
Independent Mexico
Modern Mexico
Former territorial entities in North America
1804 establishments in New Spain
1810s in Mexico
The Californias
1821 disestablishments in Mexico
1821 disestablishments in New Spain
1824 in Mexico
States and territories established in 1804
States and territories disestablished in 1821
States and territories established in 1824
1824 establishments in Mexico
States and territories disestablished in 1931
1931 disestablishments in Mexico